Norwood Park is a  park located in West Norwood. The park is bordered by Elder Road, Central Hill and Salter's Hill in South East London.

The park is jointly managed by Lambeth Council and the community group Friends of Norwood Park.

The park is not fenced and is fully accessible to the public at all times.

Location 

On a clear day, famous sights can be seen from the park such as St Paul's Cathedral, the London Eye and the Shard, the tallest building in Western Europe. The fifth tallest structure in London, Crystal Palace transmitting station, is about a mile away and clearly viewable from the park.

The park is hilly as it joins with Central Hill and Salter's Hill, and during periods of snow provides a good location for downhill sledging.

The West End & Crystal Palace Railway line passes alongside the perimeter of the park between Gipsy Hill railway station & West Norwood railway station. In the 1960s the railway line area was popular for train-spotting steam trains.

History

Norwood Park represents the last evidence of the wooded common lands of medieval Norwood. The name Norwood derives from the ‘Great North Wood’ of Surrey,  of wooded lands, which in the 18th century, extended from Croydon to Camberwell.

The Great North Wood was originally common land in the Manors of Croydon and Lambeth and most of it belonged to the Archbishop of Canterbury. The cultural heritage of the park is largely derived from its history as rural common land.

In 2011, the park celebrated its centenary. Over a hundred years ago, the park was handed over to the community as a common, under the stewardship of the council.

In the 13th century, the Great North Wood, was (aside from being a food source), "a vital supplier of timber for the Royal Dockyards at Deptford." Today, the only remnant left of this ancient British woodland is found at "Sydenham Hill Wood".

The Great North Wood "was gradually lost to housing, fields and roads, and by the end of the 18th Century had almost disappeared. The Archbishop of Canterbury obtained an Act of Parliament in 1806 to enclose the remaining common land within the Manor of Lambeth and much of it was built upon.

 remained as open space and London County Council acquired it in 1903 to create a new public park to serve the needs of a growing local population in West Norwood and Gipsy Hill. The new park was called 'Norwood Park' and opened officially to the public in 1911. It was designed to retain many features of the old hilly common, along with avenues of trees, hedges, games court and playground."

Sports facilities 
 Floodlit concrete sports pitch 
 All concrete Skatepark 
 Outdoor gym

Family facilities 

 A dog free children's play area

 Playground including water play
 One O’Clock Club

Other features
 The Hungry Hippo Cafe
 Country walk
 Homegrowers area
 Public toilets

Trees
There are around 30 different species of trees in the park including oak, horse chestnut, sycamore and some of the best collections of willows in Lambeth, including goat willows, white willows, grey willows and osiers.

Country walk
Starting in 2001, volunteers turned the three-acre piece of land, once overgrown with brambles, into a Country Walk. The walk contains many native species of trees and plants.

BMX usage 
For a number of years the concrete sports pitch has been used by Flatland BMX'ers who refer to it as 'The Green Mile' or 'TGM' for short.

References

External links
 Friends of Norwood Park

Parks and open spaces in the London Borough of Lambeth
History of the London Borough of Lambeth